Eclipsiodes anthomera is a moth in the family Crambidae. It was described by Oswald Bertram Lower in 1896. It is found in Australia, where it has been recorded from South Australia.

References

Moths described in 1896
Heliothelini